John Gramlick was an English plumber and one of the founders of the Vienna Cricket and Football-Club. In 1897, he started the Challenge Cup, a football competition for Austria-Hungary.

References

Football in Austria-Hungary